An Indian summer is a period of unseasonably warm, dry weather that sometimes occurs in autumn in temperate regions of the northern hemisphere. Several sources describe a true Indian summer as not occurring until after the first frost, or more specifically the first "killing" frost.

Etymology
The late 19th-century lexicographer Albert Matthews made an exhaustive search of early American literature in an attempt to discover who coined the expression. The earliest reference he found dated to 1851. He also found the phrase in a letter written in England in 1778, but discounted that as a coincidental use of the phrase.

Later research showed that the earliest known reference to Indian summer in its current sense occurs in an essay written in the United States circa 1778 by J. Hector St. John de Crevecoeur. The letter was first published in French. The essay remained unavailable in the United States until the 1920s.

Although the exact origins of the term are uncertain, it was perhaps so-called because it was first noted in regions inhabited by Native Americans, or because the natives first described it to Europeans, or it had been based on the warm and hazy conditions in autumn when Native Americans hunted.  John James Audubon wrote about "The Indian Summer that extraordinary Phenomenon of North America" in his journal on November 20, 1820. He mentions the "constant Smoky atmosphere" and how the smoke irritates his eyes. Audubon suspects that the condition of the air was caused by "Indians, firing the Prairies of the West." Audubon also mentions in many other places in his writings the reliance Native Americans had on fire. At no point does Audubon relate an Indian Summer to warm temperatures during the cold seasons.

Because the warm weather is not a permanent gift, the connection has been made to the pejorative term  Indian giver. It is also suggested that it comes from historic Native American legends, granted by the God or "Life-Giver" to various warriors or men, to allow them to survive after great misfortune, such as loss of crops.

Usage

Weather historian William R. Deedler wrote that "Indian summer" can be defined as "any spell of warm, quiet, hazy weather that may occur in October or November," though he noted that he "was surprised to read that Indian Summers have been given credit for warm spells as late as December and January." Deedler also noted that some writers use Indian summer in reference to the weather in only New England, "while others have stated it happens over most of the United States, even along the Pacific coast."

In literature and history, the term is sometimes used metaphorically. The title of Van Wyck Brooks' New England: Indian Summer (1940) suggests an era of inconsistency, infertility, and depleted capabilities, a period of seemingly robust strength that is only an imitation of an earlier season of actual strength. William Dean Howells' 1886 novel Indian Summer uses the term to mean a time when one may recover some of the happiness of youth. The main character, jilted as a young man, leads a solitary life until he rediscovers romance in early middle age.

In British English, the term is used in the same way as in North America. In the UK, observers knew of the American usage from the mid-19th century onward, and The Indian Summer of a Forsyte is the metaphorical title of the 1918 second volume of The Forsyte Saga by John Galsworthy. However, early 20th-century climatologists Gordon Manley and Hubert Lamb used it only when referring to the American phenomenon, and the expression did not gain wide currency in Great Britain until the 1950s. In former times, such a period was associated with the autumn feast days of St. Martin and Saint Luke.

In the English translation of Boris Pasternak's Doctor Zhivago, the term is used to describe the unseasonably warm weather leading up to the October Revolution.

Other names and similar phenomena
Similar weather conditions with local variations also exist. A warm period in autumn is called "Altweibersommer" (de: old women's summer) in Germany, Austria, Switzerland, Lithuania, Hungary (Hungarian: vénasszonyok nyara), Estonia (Estonian: vananaistesuvi), and in a number of Slavic-language countries—for example, in the Czech Republic, Ukraine, Poland, Slovakia, Russia and Slovenia, – it is known as "(old) women's summer" (. In Bulgaria, it is known as "gypsy summer" or "poor man's summer," and in Serbia it is known as "Miholjsko leto" because Saint Michael or "Miholjdan" is celebrated on October 12. In Sweden, there's "Brittsommar" (out of "Birgitta" and "Britta", having their name days around the time, on October 7). In Finland, the period is today called "intiaanikesä," a direct translation, but historically a warm period in autumn was named after Bartholomew, his saint day being in late August. In Gaelic Ireland, the phenomenon is called "fómhar beag na ngéanna" (little autumn of the geese).

In temperate parts of South America—such as southernmost Brazil, Argentina, Chile and Uruguay—the phenomenon is known as "Veranico," "Veranito" or "Veranillo" (literally, "little summer"), and usually occurs in early autumn, between late April and mid-May, when it is known as "Veranico de Maio" ("May's little summer") or as "Veranito de San Juan" ("Saint John's little summer"). Its onset and duration are directly associated with the occurrence of El Niño.

In other countries, it is associated with autumnal name days or saint days, such as Teresa of Ávila (Portugal, Spain and France), St. Martin's Summer (Spain, France, Italy, Portugal and Malta), St. Michael's summer ("Miholjsko leto", Serbia, Montenegro and Bosnia and Herzegovina), St. Martin's Day (Netherlands and Italy), St. Demetrius (Greece and Cyprus), Bridget of Sweden in Sweden, and Saint Michael the Archangel in Wales (haf bach Mihangel). In Turkey, it is called pastırma yazı, meaning "pastrami summer," since the month of November was considered to be the best time to make pastırma (the meat that, though slightly different, pastrami originated from).

The American Meteorological Society (AMS) also notes that a similar phenomenon may be referred to poetically as halcyon days, a term that originated in Greek mythology. Halcyon days in Greece take place in winter, usually 16-31 of January and last around 4-7 days with extremely warm and sunny days. "All-hallown summer" or "All Saints' summer" is also referenced in English folklore and by Shakespeare, but its use appears to have died out.

In media

Board games
 Indian Summer, designed by Uwe Rosenberg, is named and themed after the event, and involves players placing leaf-filled tiles on the forest floor.

Books
 An Indian Summer: A Personal Experience of India was written by James Cameron in 1974.
 Engine Summer written by John Crowley in 1979, is named after and refers to the event, with the spelling changed to reflect the post-apocalyptic setting of the book.
 Indian Summer by John Knowles, published in 1966.
 Indian Summer was written by Adalbert Stifter in 1857.
 Indian Summer was written by William Dean Howells in 1886.
 Indian Summer: The Secret History of the End of an Empire was written by Alex von Tunzelmann in 2007.
 Indian Summer: The Tragic Story of Louis Francis Sockalexis, the First Native American in Major League Baseball was written by Brian McDonald in 2003.
 The graphic novel Indian Summer was written by Hugo Pratt and illustrated by Milo Manara in 1983.
 The Indian Summer Of English Chivalry written by Arthur Ferguson in 1960.

Comics
 Indian Summer, Hugo Pratt, Nantier Beall Minoustchine, October 1, 1993.
 Injun Summer, John T. McCutcheon, Chicago Tribune, September 30, 1907.

Music
 In 1945 Coleman Hawkins recorded a jazz version of the Victor Herbert/Al Dubin tune on tenor sax.
 In 1966 The Doors recorded their original song "Indian Summer" (Morrison/Krieger), which was released on their 1970 album Morrison Hotel.
 In 1969, Brewer & Shipley recorded their own song "Indian Summer", for the Weeds album.
 In 1975, Joe Dassin recorded the song "Indian Summer" in French, English, Spanish and German. "L'Été indien" was based on the song "Africa" by Toto Cutugno, hence the subtitle "L'Été indien (Africa)" on some single releases. It went on to become Dassin's biggest hit, selling almost 2 million copies worldwide. Nancy Sinatra and Lee Hazlewood released an English language cover of the song as a single in 1976.
 In 1977 Poco released the album Indian Summer, which contained the title track written by Paul Cotton.
 Jay Ferguson's 1977 song "Thunder Island" contains the passage "She was the color of the Indian Summer".
 In 1978 Joe Walsh recorded his song "Indian Summer" for the album But Seriously, Folks....
 In 1981 Al Stewart released his song "Indian Summer" on his first live album Live/Indian Summer.
 In 1983 Belle Stars released a single called "Indian Summer". It also features on the Belle Stars album.
 In 1983 Per Gessle released an instrumental song called "Indiansommar" (Swedish for Indian summer) on his self-titled debut album.
 In 1984, U2 included "Indian Summer Sky" on their The Unforgettable Fire album.
 In 1985 Larry Gatlin and Barry Gibb wrote their song "Indian Summer", which was released on the Larry Gatlin & The Gatlin Brothers album Smile (1985), as performed by Larry, Barry and Roy Orbison.
 In 1987 the band Opal released their version of The Doors song on the Chemical Imbalance Limited Edition 45 (#003).
 In 1987 The Dream Academy recorded their song "Indian Summer" for the album Remembrance Days.
 In 1988, Beat Happening released the Calvin Johnson penned "Indian Summer" on their album Jamboree.
 In 1992 Go West released an album called Indian Summer.
 In 1992 the Victor Herbert/Al Dubin tune was recorded by Tony Bennett for his Frank Sinatra tribute album, Perfectly Frank.
 In 1992, The Rippingtons released "Indian Summer" as the fourth track on their album Weekend in Monaco.
 In 1993, Paul Westerberg released "First Glimmer," a song that references an Indian Summer.
 In 1993 Luna released their version of the Beat Happening song on their EP Slide.
 In 1993, the emo band Indian Summer was formed in Oakland, California. They disbanded in 1994.
 In 2002 Pedro the Lion released the David Bazan penned "Indian Summer" on their album Control.
 In 2004 Carbon Leaf released a collection of all-original songs on their album, Indian Summer released on Vanguard Records.
 In 2004 Tori Amos recorded her song "Indian Summer" for the EP Scarlet's Hidden Treasures.
 In 2007 Ben Gibbard's version of the "Beat Happening" song was included on the Kurt Cobain About a Son: Music from the Motion Picture soundtrack.
 In 2007 classical composer Pyarelal Sharma wrote Indian Summer: 8 Enchanting Pieces for String Quartet.
 In 2007 jazz musician Dave Brubeck released his first solo piano album in 50 years on Telark, called "Indian Summer", after his version of the title song by Victor Herbert and Al Dubin.
 In 2007 Manic Street Preachers released their song "Indian Summer" as the third single released from their album Send Away the Tigers.
 In 2009 country duo Brooks and Dunn released their own "Indian Summer", as the lead single to their fifth greatest hits package, #1s… and Then Some.
 In 2009, Mandy Moore released the album Amanda Leigh which includes the song "Indian Summer" that she co-wrote with Mike Viola and Inara George.
 In 2010 Australian record producer Gabriel Gleeson began releasing electronic music and performing under the name Indian Summer.
 In 2011 Loaded (sometimes called Duff McKagan's Loaded) released their song "Indian Summer" on the album called The Taking.
 In 2013 Stereophonics released the Kelly Jones penned "Indian Summer", as the second single from their album Graffiti on the Train.
 In 2014 Tyler Hilton released the album Indian Summer, containing his self-penned title track.
 In 2015 Jai Wolf released his debut single "Indian Summer" on the Foreign Family Collective label.
 In 2018 Dutch singer Sharon den Adel released the song Indian Summer under her My Indigo project.
 In 2020 No Germ Candy released their version of the Beat Happening as a b-side to the Straight Talk single.
 Katy Perry's 2009 song "Thinking of You" contains the passage "You're like an Indian summer in the middle of a winter".
 Other jazz versions based on the Victor Herbert tune with Al Dubin lyrics were recorded by the Ginny Simms with Kay Kyser & his Orchestra (December 1939 recording for Columbia 78rpm single), Gene Krupa Orchestra (recorded live on radio, January 1940), Bing Crosby (on Bing Crosby – Victor Herbert 7" 45rpm box set, for Decca in 1950), Lee Konitz and Billy Bauer (recorded for Prestige on 1951 Lee Konitz: The New Sounds 10" and 1956 Conception LP), Stan Getz on the Stan Getz Quartets LP (recorded June 1949 for Prestige LP in 1955), The Hi-Lo's from their On Hand LP (Starlite 1956), Joe Puma with Bill Evans (from the album Joe Puma Jazz Trio and Quartet, on Jubilee, 1957), Dave Brubeck on his first solo piano album Dave Brubeck Plays and Plays and... (Fantasy Records 1957), Ella Fitzgerald with the Count Basie Orchestra featuring the Tommy Flanagan Trio (recorded live in 1972), Paul Desmond (1973 on Skylark), and Sarah Vaughan with the Count Basie Orchestra (on Send in the Clowns 1974).
 Sidney Bechet recorded a jazz version of the Victor Herbert/Al Dubin tune on soprano sax in 1940.
 The Glenn Miller Big Band Orchestra version of Victor Herbert and Al Dubin's tune with vocalist Ray Eberle, rose to number 8 from late 1939 into 1940.
 The Victor Herbert/Al Dubin tune was a number 1 hit for Tommy Dorsey's Big Band Orchestra with Jack Leonard on vocals in 1939.
 The Victor Herbert/Al Dubin tune was recorded by Frank Sinatra on his album with Duke Ellington, Francis A, and Edward K., in 1968.
 Victor Herbert composed the song "Indian Summer" in 1919 for classical orchestra and Al Dubin wrote lyrics in 1939.

Painting
In 1875 Józef Chełmoński painted a picture Indian Summer  with a wide landscape panorama.

In 1922 Willard Leroy Metcalf painted Indian Summer, Vermont

Poetry

 Alma Luz Villanueva wrote "Indian Summer Ritual".
 Barry Middleton wrote "Indian Summer".
 Dorothy Parker wrote her own "Indian Summer".
 Emily Dickinson wrote some 20 poems about Indian Summer, including "These Are the Days When Birds Come Back", "The Gentian Weaves Her Fringes" and "There Is a June When Corn Is Cut"
 Henry Wadsworth Longfellow's poem The Song of Hiawatha (1855) mentions "the tender Indian Summer"
 Jayanta Mahapatra wrote "Indian Summer".
 Kate Harrington wrote "Legend of the Indian Summer".
 Oliver Wendell Holmes wrote "Our Indian Summer".
 Robert William Service wrote "My Indian Summer".
 Vachel Lindsay wrote "An Indian Summer Day on the Prairie".
 William Wilfred Campbell's poem "Indian Summer".

See also
 Blackberry winter
 Velvet season

References

Further reading

External links

 

Autumn
Summer